Fakunya Chiefdom is a chiefdom in Moyamba District of Sierra Leone. Its capital is Gandohun.

References 

Chiefdoms of Sierra Leone
Southern Province, Sierra Leone